Manito, officially the Municipality of Manito, is a 4th class municipality in the province of Albay, Philippines. According to the 2020 census, it has a population of 26,162.

History

The first settlers in the area came from Bacon, Cagraray Island or Casiguran which are geographically situated near Manito. In prehistoric time, the Bicolanos from the above-mentioned places had shown evidence of civilization. Recently artifacts unearthed from this place both by Filipino and foreign anthropologist show that Bicol is indeed inhabited first by Bicolanos, not traders from foreign lands.

In 1840, a few settlers the Visayas came and settled in the place near the coast of Manito, because of fear from Moro invaders. They officially established the place and named it Manito, because it was abounding in clinging vine called nito, which belongs to the rattan family and is used as raw material for making baskets. When nito vines are artistically made into baskets, the finished products are natural dark brown in color similar to the color of coffee. The prefix "Ma" means "plenty", then Manito means "plenty of nito".

Later, natives from the neighboring towns of Albay, Bacon, and Rapu-rapu who fled from the Moro raiders found a safer place near the seashore and near the thick west Of Manito. In the past this town was surrounded by thick forest that gave natural fiction — a haven of safety and comfort — to the Visayan settlers. Although they were brave and courageous, they lacked arms and ammunitions to fight the Moros.

In the early years of settlement, the center of this place that soon became the Poblacion had only a few scattered houses. As forests were cut, the cleared areas were planted with abaca and other crops. Due to the abundance of food and money which the people earned through the sale of their forest and agricultural products, Manito became a progressive settlement. But today it is left behind by neighboring towns. Forests are mostly denuded due to cutting in the 1980s, while replanting of trees has been neglected.

Geography

According to the Philippine Statistics Authority, the municipality has a land area of  constituting  of the  total area of Albay.

Manito is located on the south-eastern tip of Albay, adjoining the south-eastern limit of Legazpi City. The west and NW coast of Manito lies along Poliqui Bay opposite the city of Legazpi. To the north and north-east coast of the municipality lies Albay Gulf. To the east and south of Manito is the province of Sorsogon separated by the Pocdol Mountains, which is also called as the Bacon-Manito Volcanic Complex.  Because of topography, the two provinces are not connected along the coast.  A mountain pass from barangay Nagotgot connects Manito to Sorsogon City in Sorsogon province.

Southwest of the poblacion is barangay Buyo separated by the Buyo River. The two rivers serve as irrigation for small rice fields and water sources for the residents.

Barangays
Manito is politically subdivided into 15 barangays. 14 are classified as rural areas and only the poblacion (town center, also known as Barangay It-ba), is classified as an urban area.  The poblacion is situated on the north-western seashore of the town, south of the mouth of the Camanitohan River. Northwest of the town center is barangay Cawit, separated by the Caminatohan.

Climate

Demographics

In the 2020 census, Manito had a population of 26,162.

Economy

The municipality is a supplier of lasa grass and its final product - soft broom. A significant number of households are engaged in soft broom making as a source of livelihood. Many households are still engaged in cottage industries like basket making in spite of the dwindling supply of nito vines.

In 1982, the municipality of Manito emerged in the limelight by virtue of PD k.20364 establishing Manito as reservation area for Geothermal Exploration and development. In June 1994, the Bacman Geothermal Production Field has started its full operation and in October 1998, President Joseph Estrada inaugurated the additional 1.5 megawatt power/multi-crop drying plant located at Pawa, Manito in support of his food security program.

Town fiesta
Saint Raphael the Archangel is the patron saint of Manito where the town fiesta is celebrated every October 24 in his honor.

References

External links
 [ Philippine Standard Geographic Code]
 General Map of the Municipality of Manito

Municipalities of Albay